X-Static is the eighth studio album by American pop music duo Daryl Hall & John Oates. The album was released in September 1979, by RCA Records. Buddah Records re-released the album with two bonus tracks in 2000. "Wait for Me" reached number 18 on the Billboard charts and won a BMI airplay award.

Track listing

Personnel

The Band 
 Daryl Hall – keyboards, synthesizers, vibraphone, mando-guitar, lead vocals (tracks 1-3, 5-7, 9-12), backing vocals
 John Oates – guitar, lead vocals (tracks 3, 4, 8), backing vocals
 G. E. Smith – lead guitar
 John Siegler – bass
 Jerry Marotta – drums
 Charles DeChant – saxophone

Additional Musicians 
 David Foster – keyboards, synthesizers
 Larry Fast – synthesizer programming
 George Bitzer – synthesizer programming
 Steve Porcaro – synthesizer programming
 Ralph Schuckett – organ
 Steve Love – guitar
 Werner Fritzsching – guitar
 Jay Graydon – guitar
 Neil Jason – bass 
 Kenny Passarelli – bass 
 Yogi Horton – drums
 Jimmy Maelen – percussion

Production 
 Tracks #1-10 and Bonus Track #11 produced by David Foster
 Bonus Track #12 produced by Daryl Hall
 Engineer – Ed Sprigg
 Assistant Engineers – Bruce Buchalter, David Leonard, Mark Linett and Jon Smith.
 Recorded at The Hit Factory (New York, NY).
 Mixed by Humberto Gatica at Sunset Sound (Los Angeles, CA).
 Equipment – Keith Brewer
 Cover Design – Kathy Hohl
 Photography – George Nakano
 Management – Tommy Mottola
2000 Reissue
 Reissue Producers – Jeremy Holiday and Rob Santos
 Mastering – Elliott Federman
 Digital Transfers Technician – Mike Harty
 Redesign – Pete Ciccone
 Product Manager – John Huston
 Production Assistance – Glenn Korman, Steve Strauss, Tom Tierney and Frank Ursoleo.
 Project Coordination – Arlessa Barnes, Stephanie Kika, Robin Manning, Donna Malyszko, Brooke Nochomson, Larry Parra, Dana Renert, Bill Stafford and Traci Werbel.

Singles

References

1979 albums
Hall & Oates albums
Buddah Records albums
Albums produced by David Foster
Disco albums by American artists